Johnathan Michael Wood (born 9 September 1948) is an English former professional footballer. He made 7 appearances in the football league for Wrexham in the 1960s. He also played for Rhyl.

References

1948 births
Living people
English footballers
Association football defenders
Wrexham A.F.C. players
Rhyl F.C. players